You're Not Like Me is the first EP of hardcore band Raised Fist.

Track listing

Too Late to Change 1:57
Respect 2:00
To Make Up My Mind 1:25
Give Yourself a Chance 2:09
Break Free 2:50
Stand Up and Fight 3:16

Musicians

 Petri "Pecka" Rönnberg - Guitar
 "Peson" - Guitar
 Peter "Pita" Karlsson – Drums
 Andreas "Josse" Johansson - Bass
 Alexander "Alle" Hagman - Vocals

Raised Fist albums
1994 EPs
Burning Heart Records EPs